The Eidsfossen Hydroelectric Power Station (or Eidsfossen kraftstasjon) is a decommissioned hydroelectric power station in the municipality of Tynset in Innlandet county, Norway.

The power station is located in the Kvikne Forest (Kvikneskogen). The power plant was built to supply electricity to the Røstvangen Mines and built from 1915 to 1917, when it became operational. The plant was decommissioned in 1999.

References

External links
Virtual tour of the Eidsfossen Hydroelectric Power Station
Photos of the decommissioned power station

Hydroelectric power stations in Norway
Tynset